is a Japanese professional golfer.

Fukuzawa played on the Japan Golf Tour, winning once.

Professional wins (2)

Japan Golf Tour wins (1)

Japan Golf Tour playoff record (1–1)

Japan Challenge Tour wins (1)

External links

Japanese male golfers
Japan Golf Tour golfers
Sportspeople from Tokyo
1963 births
Living people